Johripur is a village in North East district in the Indian territory of Delhi.

Johripur village is founded by a Gurjar clan, more than 900 years ago( exact time/date is not known). There were two Jindhad Gotra Gurjar brothers, one is Gokal and other is Johri. Gokal establish village Gokalpur and Johri established village Johripur. The present population majorly includes Gurjars, Pandits. 

. It was previously a village with cultivated land and few houses

Demographics
 India census, Jiwan Pur had a population of 20,765. Males constitute 54% of the population and females 46%. Jiwan Pur has an average literacy rate of 67%, higher than the national average of 59.5%: male literacy is 75%, and female literacy is 57%. In Jiwan Pur, 18% of the population is under 6 years of age.

References

Cities and towns in North East Delhi district